Kim Dong-jin (Korean: 김동진; born 9 June 1973) is a South Korean football referee. He is listed in FIFA's international referee from 2005.

Kim has served as a referee for competitions including the 2011 FIFA U-20 World Cup and qualifying for the 2010 and 2014 World Cups.

References

1973 births
Living people
South Korean football referees
AFC Asian Cup referees